The 9th Golden Raspberry Awards were held on March 29, 1989, at the Hollywood Palace to recognize the worst the movie industry had to offer in 1988.

Awards and nominations

Films with multiple nominations 
These films received multiple nominations:

See also

1988 in film
61st Academy Awards
42nd British Academy Film Awards
46th Golden Globe Awards

External links
Official summary of awards
Nomination and award listing  at the Internet Movie Database

Golden Raspberry Awards
09
1989 in American cinema
1989 in California
March 1989 events in the United States
Golden Raspberry